Live at Sugar Hill is a live album by blues musician John Lee Hooker recorded in California in 1962 and released by the Galaxy label. The album was reissued in 1974 by Fantasy as the first disc of the double LP  Boogie Chillun which added ten additional previously unreleased recordings from the same concerts.

Reception

AllMusic reviewer Richie Unterberger stated: "Recorded live in November 1962 in San Francisco, this dates from the period in which Hooker often presented himself as a sort of blues/folk singer for the coffeehouse crowd, toning down his volume and aggressiveness somewhat. There's something of a muted "unplugged" feel to these solo performances (though an electric guitar is used). It's not ineffective, though not among his best work; it's the kind of Hooker you might want to put on past midnight, just before going to sleep".

Track listing
All compositions credited to John Lee Hooker except where noted
 "I Can't Hold On" – 4:07
 "I'm Gonna Keep on Walking" – 3:28
 "I Was Standing by the Wayside" – 4:46
 "T. B. Is Killing Me" – 4:12
 "Run On Babe" – 2:17
 "This World" – 5:27
 "I Like to See You Walk" – 2:28
 "It's You I Love, Baby" – 2:31
 "Driftin' and Driftin'" – 4:02
 "You Gonna Miss Me" – 3:58
 "You're Nice and Kind to Me Lou Della" – 5:00 Additional track on Boogie Chillun
 "I Need Some Money" –	3:10 Additional track on Boogie Chillun
 "I Want to Get Married" (B.B. King, Joe Josea) – 4:30 Additional track on Boogie Chillun
 "Matchbox" (Carl Perkins) – 4:05 Additional track on Boogie Chillun
 "Boogie Chillun" – 2:43 Additional track on Boogie Chillun
 "Night Time Is the Right Time" (Leroy Carr) — 3:20 Additional track on Boogie Chillun
 "You Don't Move Me Baby" – 4:15 Additional track on Boogie Chillun
 "You Been Dealin' with the Devil" – 3:30 Additional track on Boogie Chillun
 "Cruel Little Baby" – 3:00 Additional track on Boogie Chillun
 "I Got the Key to the Highway" (Charlie Segar, Big Bill Broonzy) – 3:30 Additional track on Boogie Chillun

Personnel
John Lee Hooker – guitar, vocals

References

John Lee Hooker live albums
1963 live albums
Galaxy Records live albums
Fantasy Records live albums